Trance Atlantic Air Waves (also known as TAAW), is a side project from Enigma's Michael Cretu. He had previously worked with Jens Gad on Enigma's 1996 release Le Roi Est Mort, Vive Le Roi! and they once again teamed up for this side project. Only one studio album was released, The Energy of Sound, by Virgin Records. Most of the songs were cover versions but there were also three original songs.

Discography

Studio albums
 1998 — The Energy of Sound

Singles
 1997 — "Magic Fly"
 1998 — "Chase"
 1998 — "Crockett's Theme"

External links
 Trance Atlantic Air Waves at EnigmaMusic.com
 Trance Atlantic Air Waves Mini Site

Enigma (German band)
Virgin Records artists